Eurycea longicauda, commonly known as the long-tailed salamander or longtail salamander,<ref
 name="peterson"></ref> is a species of lungless salamander native to the Appalachian Region of the eastern United States. It is a "cave salamander" that frequents twilight zones of caves and also inhabits springs and surrounding forest.

Subspecies
There are two or three subspecies:
 E. l. longicauda (Green, 1818) (long-tailed salamander, eastern long-tailed salamander)
 E. l. melanopleura (Cope, 1894 "1893") (dark-sided salamander, black-sided salamander, Cope's cave salamander)
 E. l. pernix Mittleman, 1942 (Midland long-tailed salamander)

Eurycea guttolineata has earlier been treated as a subspecies of Eurycea longicauda (that is, as E. l. guttolineata), but is now considered a full species.

Description
Body color varies from yellow to orange-red to red with random black spots.

Reproduction
E. l. melanopleura reproduces in November to February. The eggs measure  in diameter. The larvae hatch in January–March at about  snout–vent length (SVL). They metamorphose seven months later at  SVL. Males become sexually mature between  SVL and females  SVL. The largest males and females are   SVL.

Habitat and conservation
Eurycea longicauda inhabit streamsides, spring runs, ponds, cave mouths, and abandoned mines. With wet weather, they may venture into wooded terrestrial habitats. They hide in rock crevices or under rocks, logs, etc. Eggs are laid in underground crevices associated with aquatic environments, but in caves they may also be attached to objects in or above water.

The overall population size of this species is large (probably more than 100,000). Some local populations may have been impacted by strip mining and acid drainage from coal mining, but there are no major threats overall. Its range overlaps with several protected areas.

References

External links

Eurycea
Cave salamanders
Amphibians of the United States
Endemic fauna of the United States
Taxonomy articles created by Polbot
Amphibians described in 1818